Madanmohanpur  (also referred to as Madanpur) is a  village in the Sonamukhi CD block in the Bishnupur subdivision of the Bankura district in the state of West Bengal, India.

Geography

Location

Note: The map alongside presents some of the notable locations in the subdivision. All places marked in the map are linked in the larger full screen map.

Demographics
According to the 2011 Census of India, Madanmohanpur had a total population of 1,059, of which 540 (51%) were males and 519 (49%) were females. There were 156 persons in the age range of 0–6 years. The total number of literate persons in Madanmohanpur was 564 (62.46% of the population over 6 years).

Education
Madanmohanpur Primary School is a Bengali-medium coeducational institution established in 1961. It has facilities for teaching from class I to class IV. The school has a library with 336 books.

Culture
David J. McCutchion mentions the Shyama-Sundara temple as a brick built largely plain ek-ratna with a ridged rekha tower.

The Archaeological Survey of India, Kolkata Circle describes the Shyam Sundar temple as “a brick-built Temple with a sikhara of north Indian type on top. It was built in c.17th-18th century AD.”

The Shyam Sundar Temple is included in the List of Monuments of National Importance in West Bengal by the Archaeological Survey of India (serial no. N-WB-33).

References

Villages in Bankura district